The Phoenix Suns are an American professional basketball team based in Phoenix, Arizona. They are members of the Pacific Division of the Western Conference in the National Basketball Association (NBA). The Suns are also chronologically the third-oldest team in the NBA to have never won an NBA Championship while having played in the NBA Finals at least once. The Suns play their home games at the Footprint Center (formerly the Phoenix Suns Arena, American West Arena and the US Airways Center).

The Phoenix Suns franchise has had 20 head coaches. John MacLeod is the franchise's all-time leader in coaching years and games won, winning the most regular-season and playoff games. Cotton Fitzsimmons, Mike D'Antoni and Monty Williams are the only coaches to have won the NBA Coach of the Year Award with the Suns. The Suns never have been coached by a Basketball Hall of Fame inductee. Paul Westphal has the highest all-time winning percentage with the Suns with a .685 percentage. Alvin Gentry was named head coach after Terry Porter was dismissed by the Suns after 51 games in 2008.  Gentry left the Phoenix Suns under mutual agreement to part ways on January 18, 2013. He was replaced by Lindsey Hunter halfway through the 2012–13 NBA season. He has since been replaced by former Suns player Jeff Hornacek. Hired in 2018, Serbian coach Igor Kokoškov became the first head coach born and raised outside of North America to be hired as a head coach in NBA history. Former Pelicans coach Monty Williams was hired to coach the team on May 3, 2019.

Key

Coaches

Notes
 A running total of the number of coaches of the Suns. Thus, any coach who has two or more separate terms as head coach is only counted once.
 Each year is linked to an article about that particular NBA season.

References
General

 

Specific

Lists of National Basketball Association head coaches by team

Head coaches